Harald Ganzinger (31 October 1950, Werneck – 3 June 2004, Saarbrücken) was a German computer scientist who together with Leo Bachmair developed the superposition calculus, which is (as of 2007) used in most of the state-of-the-art automated theorem provers for first-order logic.

He received his Ph.D. from the Technical University of Munich in 1978. Before 1991 he was a Professor of Computer Science at University of Dortmund. Then he joined the Max Planck Institute for Computer Science in Saarbrücken shortly after it was founded in 1991. Until 2004 he was the Director of the Programming Logics department of the Max Planck Institute for Computer Science and honorary professor at Saarland University. His research group created the SPASS automated theorem prover.

He received the Herbrand Award in 2004 (posthumous) for his important contributions to automated theorem proving.

References

Rewrite-Based Equational Theorem Proving with Selection and Simplification, Leo Bachmair and Harald Ganzinger, Journal of Logic and Computation 3(4), 1994.

External links
Personal Homepage of Harald Ganzinger — Version of Dec.7th, 2013 saved at archive.org

1950 births
2004 deaths
Automated theorem proving
German computer scientists
Technical University of Munich alumni
Academic staff of the Technical University of Dortmund
Max Planck Institute for Informatics
Max Planck Institute directors